Cyrille Courtin (born 10 November 1971 in Fontenay-le-Comte, France) is a former professional footballer. He played as a defender.

External links
Cyrille Courtin profile at chamoisfc79.fr

1971 births
Living people
French footballers
Association football defenders
Chamois Niortais F.C. players
AS Beauvais Oise players
Grenoble Foot 38 players
Ligue 2 players